The toothed leaf chameleon, Brookesia dentata,  is a species of chameleons endemic to northwestern Madagascar. It was first described by Mocquard in 1900: 345, and has been described numerous times since then, most recently by Townsend et al. in 2009. It is affected by the collection of charcoal, forest fires, and the grazing of cattle. Its holotype provides from Maevatanana (Suberbieville).

Distribution and habitat
The toothed leaf chameleon is endemic to northwestern Madagascar, and its type locality is Suberbieville (Maevatanana). It has been confirmed to be found at Andasibe, Mandraka, and Angavo-Anjozorobe. The International Union for Conservation of Nature has classed  B. dentata as an endangered species on their IUCN Red List. The habitat of Brookesia dentata is continuing to decline due to charcoal collection, fires, and cattle. The population of Brookesia dentata is currently decreasing like the habitat. It is currently protected under the Madagascar law, and collection of the species is permitted with permission to do so.

Taxonomy
Brookesia dentata was initially described by Mocquard in 1900: 345, and has later been described many times: Werner (1911: 43), Mertens (1966: 2), Brygoo (1978: 25), Glaw and Vences (1994: 235), Klaver and Böhme (1997), Necas (1999: 277), and most recently Townsend et al. (2009). It is commonly known as the toothed leaf chameleon.

References

Reptiles described in 1900
Taxa named by François Mocquard
Brookesia